Football 5-a-side has been contested at the Summer Paralympics since 2004. The competition has consisted of a single event, men's team; women have never competed. Football 5-a-side is an adaptation of football for athletes with visual impairments including blindness. The sport, governed by the International Blind Sports Federation (IBSA), is played with modified FIFA rules.

Medalists

Medal table

Participating nations
- : denotes nation that did not take part that year.

X : denotes nation that did not advance into the final rounds.

See also
Football 7-a-side at the Summer Paralympics
Football at the Summer Olympics

References

 
Football at the Summer Paralympics